The Arts Council Norway Honorary Award is awarded annually by the Arts Council Norway. The prize is awarded annually to a person who has made a significant contribution to Norwegian art and culture. The prize committee does not solicit nominations and the decision on award is made in closed meeting. Traditionally, no decision basis for the award is announced.

The prize is monetary (in 2005 500,000 Kroner). Since the Council's thirtieth anniversary in December 1994, a bronze lion statuette by the sculptor Elena Engelsen has also been awarded.

Recipients
1968 – Frits von der Lippe
1969 – Hans Peter L'Orange, professor of archaeology
1970 – Alf Prøysen, writer and singer
1971 – Alf Rolfsen, painter
1972 – Klaus Egge, composer 
1973 – Hans Heiberg, writer
1974 – Hans Jonas Henriksen, Sami language proponent
1975 – Ingeborg Refling Hagen, writer
1976 – Sigbjørn Bernhoft Osa, folk musician
1977 – Ella Hval, actor
1978 – Olav Dalgard, film director and critic
1979 – Harald Sæverud, composer 
1980 – Sonja Hagemann
1981 – Erling Stordahl 
1982 – Halldis Moren Vesaas, writer
1983 – Sigmund Skard, professor of literature
1984 – Helge Sivertsen, politician
1985 – Lars Brandstrup, gallerist
1986 – Helge Ingstad, adventurer
1987 – Nils Johan Rud, writer and magazine editor
1988 – Arne Skouen, film dicetor
1989 – Espen Skjønberg, actor
1990 – Arne Nordheim, composer   
1991 – Synnøve Anker Aurdal, textile artist
1992 – Iver Jåks, artist
1993 – Erik Bye, singer
1994 – Anne-Cath. Vestly, children's book author
1995 – Ole Henrik Moe, gallerist, pianist
1996 – Arve Tellefsen, violinist 
1997 – Liv Ullmann, actor
1998 – Sverre Fehn, architect
1999 – Finn Carling, writer
2000 – Anne Brown, singer
2001 – Kjartan Slettemark, artist
2002 – Edith Roger, producer
2003 – Jon Fosse, writer and playwright
2004 – Jan Garbarek, saxophonist, composer
2005 – Agnes Buen Garnås, folk musician
2006 – Bruno Oldani, graphic designer
2007 – Jon Eikemo, actor
2008 – Solveig Kringlebotn, opera singer
2009 – Mari Boine, singer
2010 – Tor Åge Bringsværd, author
2011 – Inger Sitter, artist
2012 – Soon-Mi Chung and Stephan Barratt-Due, violinists
2013 – Anne Borg, dancer
2014 – Jan Erik Vold, poet
2015 – Artscape Nordland

References

Awards established in 1968
Norwegian awards
Lists of award winners
1968 establishments in Norway